Joshua Aloiye Okogie (born 1 September 1998) is a Nigerian professional basketball player for the Phoenix Suns of the National Basketball Association (NBA). He played college basketball at Georgia Tech, and was selected 20th overall in the 2018 NBA Draft by the Minnesota Timberwolves. He also represents the Nigeria national team.

Early life
Okogie emigrated with his family to the United States when he was three years old. The family settled in Snellville, Georgia, where Okogie started playing basketball for  Shiloh High School.

College career

As a 6'4" shooting guard, he was not ranked by ESPN in the recruiting class of 2016. He signed with Georgia Tech and as a freshman, Okogie averaged 16.1 points 5.4 rebounds per game and was named to the ACC All-Freshman Team. He was a third team 2017–18 All-ACC selection as a sophomore. As a sophomore, Okogie led Georgia Tech in scoring with 18.2 points per game. After the season he declared for the 2018 NBA Draft but did not hire an agent, thus leaving open the possibility of returning to school. However, he confirmed his intentions on entering the NBA Draft on May 21.

Professional career

Minnesota Timberwolves (2018–2022)

On June 21, 2018, the Minnesota Timberwolves drafted Okogie with the 20th overall pick in the 2018 NBA draft. On July 2, 2018, he signed with the Timberwolves. He participated in the 2018 NBA Summer League. After Jimmy Butler was traded from Minnesota in early November, Okogie entered the starting lineup, averaging nearly 22 minutes a game on the season. After the season, he participated in the 2019 NBA Summer League. On January 29, 2019, he was named a member of the World Team for the 2019 Rising Stars Challenge.

Phoenix Suns (2022–present) 
On July 2, 2022, Okogie signed with the Phoenix Suns. On December 7, Okogie scored a career-high 28 points in a 125–98 loss to the Boston Celtics.

National team career
Okogie plays for the Nigerian national basketball team and participated in the 2019 FIBA Basketball World Cup.

Career statistics

NBA

Regular season 

|-
| align="left" | 
| align="left" | Minnesota
| 74 || 52 || 23.7 || .386 || .279 || .728 || 2.9 || 1.2 || 1.2 || .4 || 7.7
|-
| align="left" | 
| align="left" | Minnesota
| 62 || 28 || 25.0 || .427 || .266 || .796 || 4.3 || 1.6 || 1.1 || .4 || 8.6
|-
| align="left" | 
| align="left" | Minnesota
| 59 || 37 || 20.3 || .402 || .269 || .769 || 2.6 || 1.1 || .9 || .5 || 5.4 
|-
| align="left" | 
| align="left" | Minnesota
| 49 || 6 || 10.5 || .404 || .298 || .686 || 1.4 || .5 || .5 || .2 || 2.7
|- class="sortbottom"
| style="text-align:center;" colspan="2" | Career
| 244 || 123 || 20.6 || .403 || .275 || .758 || 2.9 || 1.1 || 1.0 || .4 || 6.4

Playoffs

|-
| style="text-align:left;"|2022
| style="text-align:left;"|Minnesota
| 1 || 0 || 2.0 || — || — || — || .0 || .0 || .0 || .0 || .0
|- class="sortbottom"
| style="text-align:center;" colspan="2"|Career
| 1 || 0 || 2.0 || — || — || — || .0 || .0 || .0 || .0 || .0

College

|-
| style="text-align:left;"| 2016–17
| style="text-align:left;"| Georgia Tech
| 37 || 37 || 30.8 || .453 || .384 || .747 || 5.4 || 1.6 || 1.3 || .7 || 16.1
|-
| style="text-align:left;"| 2017–18
| style="text-align:left;"| Georgia Tech
| 24 || 24 || 36.4 || .416 || .380 || .821 || 6.3 || 2.5 || 1.8 || 1.0 || 18.2
|- class="sortbottom"
| style="text-align:center;" colspan="2"| Career
| 61 || 61 || 33.0 || .437 || .382 || .777 || 5.8 || 2.0 || 1.5 || .8 || 16.9

References

External links

Georgia Tech Yellow Jackets bio
 NBA.com bio and statistics

1998 births
Living people
21st-century African-American sportspeople
2019 FIBA Basketball World Cup players
African-American basketball players
American men's basketball players
American sportspeople of Nigerian descent
Basketball players at the 2020 Summer Olympics
Basketball players from Georgia (U.S. state)
Georgia Tech Yellow Jackets men's basketball players
Minnesota Timberwolves draft picks
Minnesota Timberwolves players
National Basketball Association players from Nigeria
Nigerian men's basketball players
Olympic basketball players of Nigeria
People from Snellville, Georgia
Phoenix Suns players
Shooting guards
Sportspeople from the Atlanta metropolitan area
Sportspeople from Lagos